State of Negation was a 5-member metal group from Haarlem, Netherlands and winner of 2011's Dutch National Metal Battle and the IJmond Popmusic Prize. The band has played over 300 shows, 1 European tour, 5 festivals (Beeckestijn Pop, Occultfest, Strudelfest, Bashfest and Metalcon) and have released a successful music video on YouTube titled Corruption. Being the young band they are, State of Negation has left a great impression with both audience and professionals: “Young, talented and an incredible sense of performance!”

With the coming of their debut EP, Project Payback, released in early 2013, they made quite a step forward by doing support for Suicide Silence in Patronaat, Haarlem, leaving a great impression and convincing many people of their talent.
The band's main musical influences are Lamb of God, Trivium and Machine Head, which listeners will definitely hear back in both music and lyrics, which are based on political issues, personal experiences, religion and a hint of rebellion.

History
State of Negation was formed in the summer of 2010 as just a fun project consisting of Casper Leijen, Mike van Bekkum, Pim Nijssen, Tristan Jacobs and Sang-Jae Kouwenberg. Sang-Jae left the band in 2011 but before he left he did contribute on their Single "Corruption". He was replaced by drummer Mike de Vries who contributed on both their EPs. Pim Nijssen left in 2014 and was replaced by Maurice ter Velde.

After playing 30 shows together with bands like Purest of Pain, Pound, Gottlieb and Die for the Purpose of Living they were selected out of 41 bands to get a change to win the Dutch Metal 2011.

Among others, State of Negation has shared the stage with The Charm The Fury, Ethereal, Suicide Silence, 3rd Machine, Purest of Pain, Divine Sins, Illucinoma and Onslaught.

The video for Corruption was made available online on 22 June 2011 on YouTube and is featured as a Bonus Track on Project Payback and has had over 6500 views.

As of 4 March 2014 State of Negation has replaced guitarist Pim Nijssen who left 14 February 2014 with guitarist Maurice ter Velde who introduced himself in a band posted YouTube video.

September 2014 State of Negation cancelled future shows stating they will explain this later. They posted of 24 September 2014 officially that their drummer Mike de Vries left the band. They were unclear about having a replacement or not but assured that they wouldn't disband. On December 11 there was shown some art on their Facebook page with an unknown person named Dennis among the band. This later turned out to be their new drummer.

On January 29, 2015 State of Negation officially introduced their new drummer to the audience: Dennis kraakman. Before this he already played some gigs with the band and was in favour of his performance.

On April 3, 2015 State of Negation officially announced they're break-up as a result from continuous problems like the departure of Mike de Vries and not being able to spend enough time with the band. The band had the following to say about this:  "...But the last year has been a difficult one for us.We’ve had to let go 2 bandmembers, cancelled some promising shows and we’ve been struggling a lot with investing time into the growth of this band. All of us have a busy daily life and while we’ve all done our best to keep State our number 1 priority, it has become increasingly hard to focus our time..." 

State of Negation would play their final concert on 10 April 2015 in Sugarfactory Amsterdam headlining the 'Shatter The Universe event'. They gave away all of their merchandise for free and played all of their songs including a song originally written for the studio album that would never be made. This song is called "The Human Realm" which was also made a shirt of.

Project Payback

State of Negation recorded their debut EP without drummer Sang-Jae Kouwenberg who had previously worked with them on "Corruption" It was released on February 1, 2013. This release noted their style and raised awareness onto the metal scene. It is marked as State of Negation's best release.

Track list
From State of Negation's home page. 
 "Project Payback" (3:55)
 "The Light" (3:37)
 "Concussioned" (3:51)
 "Visum Veritas" (3:56)
Total: 15:19

Bonus tracks

Total: 22:17

Self-produced and home-recorded with the exception of "Hades" and "Corruption"

Personnel

District Unknown

State of Negation began to record their second EP around October 2013. It was released on 23 November 2013, it received positive reviews with most people claiming it is heavier than their previous release Project Payback. At the release party in Haarlem in Hardrock cafe "Bone" State of Negation played songs of the new EP as well as songs of the old one.

Track list
 "District Unknown" (4:42)
 "Done My Own" (4:01)
 "Gunslinger" (3:40)
 "Thou Shalt Bleed" (3:45)
 "Derealise" (4:21)
Total: 20:49

Guitarist Pim Nijssen left the band 4 months after its release on 14 February.

New album
In 2014 State of Negation announced on their Facebook that they were working on a new album. After a European tour through Germany, Austria and Hungary they lined up at Metalcon festival 2014 where they also played a new song for the new album called 'The Human Realm'. The song would however never be recorded and the album never finished due to their break-up.

Discography
EPs
 Project Payback (1 February 2013)  
 District Unknown (23 November 2013)

Music videos
 Corruption (2011)

Band members
Final members
 Casper Leijen – vocals (2010 – 2015)
 Tristan Jacobs – lead guitar (2010 – 2015)
 Mike Van Bekkum – bass (2010 – 2015)
 Maurice ter Velde - rhythm guitar (2014 - 2015)
 Dennis Kraakman - drums (2015)

Former members
 Mike De Vries – drums (2012 – 2014)
 Pim Nijssen – rhythm guitar (2010–2014)
 Sang-Jae Kouwenberg – drums (2010–2012)

Awards
Metal Battle 2011
Ijmond Popprijs

Influences
State of Negation has been influenced by several bands like Lamb of God, Trivium, Threat Signal and Sonic Syndicate.

References

External links
 Facebook.com
 Stateofnegation.nl
 Twitter.com
 Metal-archives.com

Dutch heavy metal musical groups
Musical groups established in 2010
2010 establishments in the Netherlands